Zemo-Monasteri is a settlement in the Tskhinvali district of South Ossetia, a region of Georgia whose sovereignty is disputed.

See also
 Tskhinvali district

Notes

References 

Populated places in Tskhinvali District